Deborah Ross is a British journalist and author. Her work has appeared regularly in The Independent, the Daily Mail, and The Spectator. She is a columnist and feature writer for The Times.

In 2012, she was awarded broadsheet Interviewer of the Year in British Press Awards for her work in The Independent, and had previously been nominated for the award in 2006.

Personal life
Ross has a sibling, a daughter and a son.

Bibliography

 How Not to be a Domestic Goddess: (And Always Go to Bed on an Argument). Profile Books, 2008.

References

Living people
British journalists
Daily Mail journalists
The Independent people
The Spectator people
Year of birth missing (living people)